Akeem  Judd (born December 11, 1992) is a former American football running back. He played college football at Mississippi. He was signed by the Tennessee Titans as an undrafted free agent in 2017 and also spent time with the New York Jets and Green Bay Packers before announcing his retirement in August 2018.

Akeem has two sons. Akeem Daawuud Judd, Jr born 2/13/18 in New Jersey. And Koran Daawuud Judd born 4/22/19 in Nashville, Tn.

Professional career

Tennessee Titans
Judd signed with the Tennessee Titans as an undrafted free agent on May 11, 2017. He was waived/injured by the Titans on September 2, 2017 with a thumb injury and was placed on injured reserve. He was released with an injury settlement on October 10, 2017.

New York Jets
On October 24, 2017, Judd was signed to the New York Jets' practice squad. He was promoted to the active roster on December 12, 2017. He was placed on injured reserve on December 30, 2017. He was waived by the Jets on May 4, 2018.

Green Bay Packers
On August 6, 2018, Judd was signed by the Green Bay Packers. He was placed on reserve/retired list on August 18, 2018.

Akeem has two sons. Akeem Daawuud Judd, Jr born 2/13/18 in New Jersey. And Koran Daawuud Judd born 4/22/19 in Nashville, Tn.

References

External links
Ole Miss Rebels bio

1992 births
Living people
Players of American football from North Carolina
American football running backs
Ole Miss Rebels football players
Tennessee Titans players
New York Jets players
Green Bay Packers players